UFC on ESPN: Kattar vs. Chikadze (also known as UFC on ESPN 32  and UFC Vegas 46) was a mixed martial arts event produced by the Ultimate Fighting Championship that took place on January 15, 2022 at the UFC Apex facility in Enterprise, Nevada, part of the Las Vegas Metropolitan Area, United States.

Background
A featherweight bout between Calvin Kattar and Giga Chikadze headlined the event.

A women's flyweight bout between Kay Hansen and Jasmine Jasudavicius was scheduled for the event. However, the pairing was moved to UFC 270 due to undisclosed reasons.

Ashley Yoder was expected to face Vanessa Demopoulos in a women's strawweight bout at the event. Yoder eventually withdrew due to undisclosed reasons and was replaced by Silvana Gomez Juarez. The bout was pushed back to UFC 270 a few days before the event.

A middleweight bout between Joaquin Buckley and Abdul Razak Alhassan was scheduled for the event. However, the pairing was cancelled after Alhassan withdrew for undisclosed reasons. The duo was rescheduled for UFC Fight Night 201 a month later.

A flyweight between Kleydson Rodrigues and Zarrukh Adashev was scheduled for the event. However, in early January 2022, it was reported that the bout was canceled as Rodrigues has tested positive for influenza (H3N2) and Adashev has suffered an injury.

A welterweight bout between Muslim Salikhov and Michel Pereira was scheduled for the event. However, Salikhov withdrew from the bout for undisclosed reasons and the bout was cancelled. Pereira was rescheduled against André Fialho for UFC 270.

A featherweight bout between T.J. Brown and Gabriel Benitez was scheduled for the event. Three days before the event, Benitez was forced to pull out and Charles Rosa replaced him, therefore changing the contest to the lightweight division.

Saidyokub Kakhramonov was scheduled to meet Brian Kelleher in a bantamweight bout. However, Kakhramonov withdrew from the bout due to undisclosed reasons and was replaced by Kevin Croom, shifting the contest to the featherweight division.

Results

Bonus awards
The following fighters received $50,000 bonuses.
 Fight of the Night: Calvin Kattar vs. Giga Chikadze 
 Performance of the Night: Jake Collier and Viacheslav Borshchev

See also 

 List of UFC events
 List of current UFC fighters
 2022 in UFC

References 

UFC on ESPN
2022 in mixed martial arts
January 2022 sports events in the United States
2022 in sports in Nevada
Mixed martial arts in Las Vegas
Sports competitions in Las Vegas